Solano, officially the Municipality of Solano, is a 1st class municipality in the province of Nueva Vizcaya, Philippines. According to the 2020 census, it has a population of 65,287 inhabitants..

According to the BLGF 2021 data, the town of Solano has the highest locally sourced revenue (LSR) of all the municipalities in Region 2 making it one of the notable economic hubs in Cagayan Valley. This further solidified the status of Solano as the undisputed premier town of Cagayan Valley. 

Solano, being the fastest-growing municipality in the region, is proposed to become Cagayan Valley Region's 5th City after Tuguegarao, Santiago, Cauayan, and Ilagan.

Etymology
The town got its name in honor of Governor General Ramon Solano y Llanderal in 1889.

History
In 1760, the original name of the town was Bintauan, then a Gaddang settlement. The municipality was founded in 1767 by Father Alejandro Vidal, a Dominican priest who led a Spanish mission. In 1768, it was called Lungabang, from the Gaddang word for "cave". The name was later changed to Lumabang by the Spaniards for convenience. In 1851, Governor General Antonio Urbiztondo declared Lumabang a barrio of Bayombong for not having sufficient inhabitants and revenue to maintain itself. Governor General Ramon Solano y Llanderal authorized the separation of Lumabang as barrio from Bayombong. In 1853, the first Ilocanos arrived, brought by Don Diego Lumicao, a former gobernadorcillo. In 1889, it was renamed Solano, in honor of Governor General Ramon Solano y Llanderal.

The town was planned by Father Juan Villaverde, and the poblacion, as designed, consisted of 14 parallel wide streets, each having a width of 20 meters.  Streets run from north to south and east to west, forming 100 square blocks with an aggregate area of one hectare per block. Solano was the largest municipality in the province until two of its barangays, Caliat and Bintawan, were segregated to become the municipalities of Quezon and Villaverde respectively. The land area of Solano was correspondingly reduced to 13,980 hectares. In 1957, the barrios of Ibung and Bintawan were separated to form the town of Ibung, later renamed as Villaverde.

Cityhood

House Bill No. 8727 was filed last February 15, 2021 for the conversion of the municipality of Solano into a component city in the province of Nueva Vizcaya. The bill is currently pending with the committee on local government since February 22, 2021. 

The town is bidding again for cityhood in 2022 with the filing of House Bill No. 01736 Title " An Act Converting the Municipality of Solano in Nueva Vizcaya into a Component City to be known as the City of Solano."

Geography

Barangays
Solano is politically subdivided into 22 barangays. These barangays are headed by elected officials: Barangay Captain, Barangay Council, whose members are called Barangay Councilors. All are elected every three years.

Climate

Demographics

Economy 

Solano is the main commercial and financial center of Nueva Vizcaya. It also has the most number of fast food restaurants in the province, including Jollibee, Greenwich Pizza, McDonald's, KFC, Chowking, Mang Inasal, Red Ribbon, Goldilocks and more. Solano has the most number of banks among the municipalities in the entire region with 25 banks. Major banks such as Metrobank, Banco de Oro, Bank of the Philippine Islands, Philippine National Bank, Landbank, Rizal Commercial Banking Corporation, China Bank as well as rural and regional banks are based here.

Government

Solano, belonging to the lone congressional district of the province of Nueva Vizcaya, is governed by a mayor designated as its local chief executive and by a municipal council as its legislative body in accordance with the Local Government Code. The mayor, vice mayor, and the councilors are elected directly by the people through an election which is being held every three years.

Elected officials

Local chief executives

Spanish-era heads of government 
Under the Spanish regime, Solano (then Bintauan) was ruled by a gobernadorcillo, which was elected by the cabezas de barangay (barangay heads) which represented the survival of the earlier tribal organizations and were responsible for the tributes of their groups. The cabezas were originally hereditary, but, in time, it became elective. The electors of the gobernadorcillo were current or former heads of the barangay and after 3 years of service became eligible for the office.

The following list shows the gobernadorcillos, who had the honorary title "Don", during the Spanish regime from 1762 to 1898.

The following served as capitán del pueblo:

The next three years, the town head was to be known gobernadorcillo, and the position of capitan del pueblo was abolished.

 1779 Antonio Dayag
 1780 Vicente Labog
 1781 Francisco Busa

The following served as alcaldes de naturales:

 1782 Manuel Balassu
 1783 Pedro Arasa
 1784 Tomas Abbacan
 1785 Clemente Malenab
 1786 Tomas Lauagan
 1787 Domingo Dumelod
 1788 Santiago Agguid

On April 19, 1789, the alcalde mayor [of Cagayan] conveyed to the people the decree issued by the King of Spain ordering the restoration of the title gobernadorcillo.

By executive order of 1851, Governor-General Antonio Urbiztondo, Marques de la Solana, declared Lumabang as a barrio of Bayombong, resulting in the office of gobernadorcillo becoming teniente del barrio.

It was during this time when a new province, Isabela, was created, carving a portion of Nueva Vizcaya and a part of Cagayan. The new province was named in honor of Queen Isabella of Spain. The Governor of Nueva Vizcaya was Julian del Valle. The alcalde mayor of Cagayan came here for the purpose of this reorganization.

 1857 Venido Loggan
 1858 Domingo Esguerra
 1859 Miguel Dumelod
 1860 Miguel Loggan

General Ramon Solano y Llanderal authorized the separation of Lumabang as a barrio from Bayombong restoring the title of gobernadorcillo to Solano. From 1864, the term limit of the gobernadorcillo was extended from one year to two years

In 1890, the establishment of the office of the justice of the peace was inaugurated in all the towns, and the first to assume this office in Solano was Domingo Panganiban who was in turn succeeded by Juan Sobrino, a Spaniard. who was succeeded by Sebastián Panganiban. who was then succeeded by Domingo Panganiban who held this office till 1898.
 
 1890 Justice of the Peace Domingo Panganiban
 1890 Justice of the Peace Juan Sobrino
 1890 Justice of the Peace Sebastián Panganiban
 1890-98 Justice of the Peace Domingo Panganiban
 1890-91 Gobernadorcillo Antonio Dumelod
 1892-93 Gobernadorcillo Domingo Loggan (replaced by Fernando Aggabao)
 1894-95 Gobernadorcillo Sebastian Panganiban

It was during this time when the Royal Decree of the Central Government came, stopping the use of the title gobernadorcillo and in its stead capitán municipal was to be used. When Spanish colonial rule ended September 14, 1898, Solano was led by a teniente mayor.

 1896-97 Capitán Municipal Sebastián Panganiban
 1898 Teniente Mayor Felipe Lumicao

Municipal presidents

Mayors under Republican government

Culture
Festival:
 The town's Pagbiagan Festival is celebrated every year of October 11. It coincides with Solano's Founding Anniversary, as well as the feast day of the town's patron Saint Louis Beltran.

Tourism

Education
The Schools Division of Nueva Vizcaya governs the town's public education system. The division office is a field office of the DepEd in Cagayan Valley region. The office governs the public and private elementary and public and private high schools throughout the municipality.

Elementary schools

High schools
 Aldersgate College - High School Department
 Solano High School
 Saint Louis School - High School Department
 Dalton High School
 Uddiawan National High School
 Bascaran National High School

Colleges and universities
 Aldersgate College
 Solano Institute of Technology
 Nueva Vizcaya Caregiver Academy
 Niño Jesus de Praga Learning, Inc.
 Cagayan Valley Maritime Studies, Inc.
 Fuzeko Polytechnic College

Media
Solano is served by these radio stations.

AM stations
DWMG 1395 kHz (Vanguard Radio Network)

FM stations
DWDC 101.3 BiGSOUNDfm (Vanguard Radio Network)
DWNV 100.5 (Rural Airwaves Media Services-Unified Airwaves Network)

References

External links

Nueva Vizcaya Website
Solano official government website
[ Philippine Standard Geographic Code]
Philippine Census Information
Local Governance Performance Management System

Municipalities of Nueva Vizcaya
Populated places established in 1767
1767 establishments in the Spanish Empire